The William Brach House is a historic house in Hastings, Nebraska. It was built in 1884 for William Brach, his wife Charlotte and their two sons, and designed in the Queen Anne architectural style. Brach was a German immigrant and Freemason who settled in Hastings and worked as the manager of a dry goods store called Wolfbach Brothers founded by some of his relatives; and he became its president when it changed its name to Wolbach & Brach in 1907. Brach was also a civic and political leader in Hastings, where he served on the board of aldermen in 1892. The house was purchased and redesigned in the Classical Revival style by Volney B. Trimble and his wife, Mary Blackman, in 1899. Trimble worked as a grocer, and he served as a councilmember in 1922–1925. The house has been listed on the National Register of Historic Places since February 1, 1979.

References

National Register of Historic Places in Adams County, Nebraska
Queen Anne architecture in Nebraska
Neoclassical architecture in Nebraska
Houses completed in 1884
1884 establishments in Nebraska